Adrian Robertson (born 9 September 1974) is an Australian judoka. He competed in the men's extra-lightweight event at the 2000 Summer Olympics.

References

External links
 

1974 births
Living people
Australian male judoka
Olympic judoka of Australia
Judoka at the 2000 Summer Olympics
Sportspeople from Rockhampton